Claudio Amendola (born 16 February 1963) is an Italian actor, director and television presenter. He starred in the 1993 film The Escort, which was entered into the 1993 Cannes Film Festival.

Biography
Born in Rome and the son of actors and voice dubbers Ferruccio Amendola and Rita Savagnone, Amendola started his movie career during the 1980s, playing comic roles in some Italian comedies directed by Carlo Vanzina. In 1987 he played his first dramatic role in Soldati - 365 all'alba, directed by Marco Risi, and in the following decade he confirmed his dramatic skills in some movies like Ultrà (1990) and The Escort (1993), both directed by Ricky Tognazzi. During the 2000s Amendola became a very popular television actor, acting in the popular fiction I Cesaroni, the Italian version of Los Serrano.

Personal life
Amendola is married to actress Francesca Neri and they have a son together, Rocco. He also has two daughters from a previous marriage. One of them is voice actress Alessia Amendola.

Filmography

Films

Television

References

External links

1963 births
Living people
Male actors from Rome
Italian male film actors
Italian male television actors
Italian film directors
Italian television producers
Italian television presenters
David di Donatello winners
Ciak d'oro winners
20th-century Italian male actors
21st-century Italian male actors
Mass media people from Rome